Recipe for Deception is an American reality competition television series that premiered on January 21, 2016, on Bravo. Hosted by Max Silvestri, the cooking competition series features four chefs in each episode who compete with each other and get eliminated in head-to-head rounds. The chefs will be judged for creating various dishes containing one specific ingredient. Chris Oh and Jonathan Waxman are the judges.

Episodes

Broadcast 
Internationally, the series premiered in Australia within hours of the American broadcast on January 22, 2016.

References

External links

 

 

2010s American cooking television series
2016 American television series debuts
2016 American television series endings
Bravo (American TV network) original programming
2010s American reality television series
English-language television shows
Television series by Embassy Row (production company)